Tómas Andrés Tómasson (4 April 1949), commonly known as Tommi, is an Icelandic politician, restaurateur and one of the owners and founders of Tommi's Burger Joint restaurant chain. He previously ran a chain of hamburger places under the name Tommaborgarar, one of the first fast food chains in Iceland. In September 2021, Tómas was elected as a member Althing, representing the People's Party. He is the oldest first-time elected member in Alþingi's history.

Early life
Tómas was born in Reykjavík, Iceland. In June 1979 he graduated from Florida International University with a degree in Restaurant Management.

Catering 
Tommi ran the restaurant Festi in Grindavík from 1974 to 1977. After completing his studies in the hotel and restaurant business in the United States, he founded Tommaborgar in 1981. After three years, Tómas sold Tommaborgar and focused on running Hard Rock Café and Hótel Borg. In 1996 he founded Kaffibrennslan which he ran until 2002.

On 14 March 2004, 23 years after the opening of Tommaborgarar, Tommi opened a new burger place called Tommi's Burger Joint.

References
Althing biography

Tomasson, Tomas A.
Tomasson, Tomas A.
21st-century Icelandic politicians
Icelandic businesspeople
Restaurateurs
Fast-food chain founders

Members of the Althing
People's Party (Iceland) politicians
Politicians from Reykjavík
Florida International University alumni